is a puzzle-platform game developed and published by Japanese software developer Hudson Soft in 1983. The game was released for the FM-7, MSX, NEC PC-8801, NEC PC-6001, and later to the Famicom in Japan. It was the first third-party video game to be released on a Nintendo console.

Gameplay

Both versions of Nuts & Milk involve the player moving through various levels while collecting an assortment of fruit scattered throughout each of them. By gathering all the fruit on a particular screen, the player will gain access to a previously unopened house door containing Milk's fiancée, Yogurt. When the player makes contact with the female blob, they are advanced to the next level to start the process anew. Movement through these levels is accomplished by using the directional pad or keyboard to move Milk across the stage while avoiding pitfalls and other obstacles, most notably the character's rival, Nuts. If contact is made at any time during game play with Nuts or other harmful objects such as miniature blimps, the player will lose a life and have to restart the current level, with all fruit reset back to their initial positions. Once all three of Milk's lives are lost in this fashion, the game ends.

In the Famicom version, Milk can jump a short distance vertically or horizontally, allowing him to traverse pits or quickly gain access to an adjacent platform. If the player falls from too great a distance, Milk will become momentarily dazed and unable to move until the player joggles him awake with the jump button. Rope bridges are suspended in mid-air on most levels, and by using the directional pad, the player can climb them up or down as well as walk across them once they reach the top. In all, 50 individual levels exist on the Famicom version, and each one can be skipped freely by pressing the select button. Once a player has cycled through all fifty of them, he will return to the first level and restart the sequence until all of Milk's lives are lost.

The Famicom and MSX version also contain a level editor mode where the player can freely edit the first stage of the game by placing objects or enemies on the screen for Milk to interact with. This stage then takes the place of the first level in normal game play until the console is reset.

Plot
Set in a fantasy world, Nuts & Milk follows the story of a pink male blob named Milk, who must find his fiancée, Yogurt, a similar pink blob with a red hair bow, and rescue her from Nuts, a teal blob who also vies for her affection. The journey will take Milk through several levels where the process of finding and saving his love will repeat itself several times as Nuts mounts an ever-present resistance against his quest for romance.

Development
Originally developed by Japanese software company Hudson Soft for several home computers in Japan, Nuts & Milk became the company's first Famicom video game. The game itself borrows elements from Lode Runner, an earlier Hudson project, and other arcade-styled platformers such as Donkey Kong, and even emulates the title screen of Nintendo's early 1980s releases. While the game retains stylistic similarities to other games published at the time, it is unique in being an arcade-styled game that was never released on an actual arcade system.

Two different versions of the game were created: one for home computers, and one for the Famicom.

Version differences

Nuts & Milk was released for the home computers and Nintendo's Famicom at roughly the same time, and although both versions are very similar, there are a few differences in presentation. The Famicom version is played from a sideways angle typical of 2D sidescrollers with the player walking and jumping from one area to another horizontally. Conversely, the computer version is presented in a top-down fashion with all platforming elements removed, with the player instead moving in four directions. This version also contains a slight degradation in both sound and graphics, due to the comparatively less powerful personal computer hardware at the time. Though the Famicom version makes use of its standard 2-button controller, the computer releases instead rely on a keyboard. The Famicom version can optionally save user-generated content to cassette tape with the Famicom Data Recorder.

Music
The music for both versions of Nuts & Milk was composed internally by Hudson Soft and is made up entirely of synth-based chiptunes, a common audio medium for early video games. Though an exclusive soundtrack for either game was never released, the music from both versions can be found on the 1987 compilation album Hudson Game Music (catalog number 28XA-87) released in Japan by Alfa and GMO Records.

Ports
Hudson Soft ported the Famicom version to the Commodore 64. It was released in the United Kingdom in 1984 as Hot Pop and was later re-released by Melbourne House.

Legacy
A version of Nuts & Milk resembling the Famicom release has since been ported to mobile phones as a download service beginning September 1, 2003 in Japan by KG Telecom as part of their "GameMaster" compilation, which contains other Hudson Soft games from the 8-bit era. The service was later extended to other parts of the world in January 2004 by TF1 i-games.

On December 22, 2005, Hudson included Nuts & Milk in Hudson Collection Vol. 4: Nazotoki Collection for the Game Boy Advance, released exclusively in Japan.

References

External links
 Official Nintendo Wii Virtual Console Minisite 
 Official Nintendo 3DS eshop Minisite 
 Official Nintendo Wii U eshop Minisite 
 
 Nuts & Milk at IGN

1983 video games
FM-7 games
Game Boy Advance games
Hudson Soft games
Mobile games
MSX games
NEC PC-6001 games
NEC PC-8801 games
Nintendo Entertainment System games
Sharp X1 games
Video games about food and drink
Video games developed in Japan
Virtual Console games
Virtual Console games for Wii U
Multiplayer and single-player video games